Frédérique Bel (born 24 March 1975) is a French actress and model. A native of Annecy in the French Alps, she became known for her role as Dorothy Doll in the La Minute Blonde sequence from Le Grand Journal on Canal+. She has since played main and supporting roles in many productions.

Early life and education 
Frédérique Bel was born in Annecy in the department of Haute-Savoie. After obtaining her baccalauréat, she moved to the region of Alsace where she studied modern literature at the Marc Bloch University of Strasbourg. She then graduated with a master degree and a DEUG in history of arts before joining the University Theater of Strasbourg. She later began a career as a lingerie and body lining model to pay her comedy classes.

Acting career

Movie roles 
Frédérique Bel made her acting debut in 2000 playing a small role in the comedy film Deuxième vie and later in the 2003 comedy film La Beuze. She then had famous supporting roles in comedy and romantic films. These include Tu vas rire, mais je te quitte in 2004, Imposture and The Russian Dolls in 2005. She portrayed Miss France in the 2006 science fiction comedy Un ticket pour l'espace and later featured in the comedy film Camping which had a box office of 5.5 million viewers. The same year, film director Emmanuel Mouret gave her a role in his romantic comedy Change of Address, also featuring himself. She later featured in three other of his films, which are Shall We Kiss? in 2007, Fais-moi plaisir! in 2009, in which she appeared completely naked in one scene, and The Art of Love in 2011.

In 2007, she had supporting roles in comedy films Tel père telle fille and Ma vie n'est pas une comédie romantique. In 2008, she had one of the main roles in the fantastic film Les Dents de la nuit and later that year in the comedy film Vilaine. In 2009, she had a supporting role in comedy film Safari and later in another comedy film La Grande Vie, in addition to the role she had in Fais-moi plaisir! in between. She played in 2010 a small role in the fantastic adventure film The Extraordinary Adventures of Adèle Blanc-Sec directed by Luc Besson. She portrayed the main role in the 2011 thriller Red Nights where she played in Hong Kong the role of Catherine Trinquier, an inspired role of a woman who becomes a criminal. In 2012, she played in the author film L'amour dure trois ans directed by Frédéric Beigbeder, and then had a supporting role in the popular comedy Les Seigneurs directed by Olivier Dahan.

In 2013, she played one of the main roles in the romantic comedy Hôtel Normandy, filmed in the prestigious hotel Normandy Barrière located in the town of Deauville. In 2014, she portrayed one of the main characters in the comedy film Serial (Bad) Weddings with Christian Clavier and Chantal Lauby. The film was a huge success with a box office of over 200,000 viewers on its release date. She then featured the same year in the comedy-drama La Liste de mes envies, which was released soon after and is an adaptation from the novel of the same title, released in 2012.

Television roles 

Frédérique Bel began her career on television in 2001 playing a supporting role in the French sitcom Le Groupe which features stories about a group of students and their misadventures. She then rose to fame for creating and portraying the humoristic character of Dorothy Doll, in the sequence titled La Minute Blonde, where she portrays a blond stereotype talking to a celebrity made of cardboard. The sequence was included in Le Grand Journal on Canal+ hosted by Michel Denisot during the first and second season from September 2004 to June 2006.

Frédérique Bel has also played in television films such as the 2006 mini-series Petits meurtres en famille, and later in the 2012 crime series Profilage, where she portrays a manipulating lawyer until the end of the third season. To give the impression of a manipulating character, she even had to lower the tone of her voice to play the role. She had in between a supporting role in the sixth season of the historical fantasy series Kaamelott, where she portrayed Caesar's servant. She later had a regular role from 2011 to 2013 in the comedy series Fais pas ci, fais pas ça from the fourth to the sixth season. She also had a guest role in specials of television series Scènes de ménages in 2013 and Nos chers voisins in 2014. She played as Virginie Delome in the Netflix Original Series La Mante in 2017.

Voice roles 
Frédérique Bel started a career as a voice actress in 2007. Her shrill and particular voice, similar to a doll, gave her the opportunity to voice gentle female characters. She has since voiced in a number of animated films and series in both original and French versions. She began the same year in the third season of Canadian science fiction animated series Tripping the Rift, where she voiced the main character Six in the French version.

She then voiced Rose, the mother of Arthur, in the original versions of animated adventure films Arthur and the Revenge of Maltazard in 2009 and Arthur 3: The War of the Two Worlds in 2010, both directed by Luc Besson. In 2010, she voiced Barbie in the French version of Toy Story 3 and the same character the following year in Hawaiian Vacation, the first short film of the Toy Story Toons series.

Advertisement 
From 2001 to 2004, Frédérique Bel appeared in several television advertisements for various brands like Bouygues of Étienne Chatiliez, Darty of Yvan Attal, EDF of Jean-Pierre Jeunet, and also Mir Laine of Philippe Lioret where she portrayed the fairy. She later appeared in an advertisement for the optical brand Krys with other celebrities, including Alain Delon, Jane Birkin, Michel Blanc and Frédéric Beigbeder.

Activism 

Frédérique Bel is the spokesperson of the foundation AMFE (Association Maladies Foie Enfants) that she supports since its creation. She created with her team a national campaign of prevention from liver disease of young children. She portrayed again for that occasion her character of Dorothy Doll from La Minute Blonde.

She is also an avid supporter and defender of women's rights all around the world, a cause that she has often expressed in the media and on the social networks. She posted on her Twitter account a picture of her naked to defend the right for the IVG (Interruption Volontaire de Grossesse, the French equivalent for abortion).

Controversies 
Frédérique Bel has posted pictures and comments via social networks which caused a lot of controversy. In 2012 on her official Twitter account, while supporting François Hollande during the 2012 French presidential election, she was suspended after having posted pictures of her naked, only two days after having created her account. Her suspension was over three days later and she was allowed to post again on her account.

In November 2014, her Facebook account was blocked for seven days for the head comment she posted on two articles she shared about trafficking of women in the Islamic State. She then used her Twitter account to express her anger of being censored by Facebook. She also added in an attached link the message she wrote them stating that she defends women's rights in the world and that she was angry for being blocked.

Filmography

References

External links

1975 births
Living people
French female models
French feminists
French film actresses
French stage actresses
French television actresses
French voice actresses
French women's rights activists
People from Annecy
21st-century French actresses